WWF Aggression is a soundtrack album by WWE (then known as the World Wrestling Federation, or WWF). Released on March 21, 2000 by Priority Records, it features entrance music of WWE wrestlers re-recorded by various hip hop artists and groups. The album was a commercial success, charting at number eight on the US Billboard 200.

Composition
Stephen Thomas Erlewine of music website AllMusic categorised WWF Aggression in hip hop genres such as hardcore hip hop and gangsta rap, describing it as "straight-ahead hardcore rap, targeted at WWF's audience." Six of the album's 13 tracks were produced by Binky of West Coast hip hop duo Allfrumtha I, with other producers including Jam Master Jay and Rockwilder.

Reception

Commercial
WWF Aggression was a commercial success. In the US, the album reached number eight on the US Billboard 200 and number ten on the Top R&B/Hip-Hop Albums chart; in Canada, it reached number six on the Canadian Albums Chart. It was certified gold by the Recording Industry Association of America, indicating sales of over 500,000 units, and was also certified gold by Music Canada and silver by the British Phonographic Industry.

Critical
Music website AllMusic awarded the album three out of five stars. Writer Stephen Thomas Erlewine proposed that "since [the album] is targeted at [WWF's] male adolescent audience, it's just thuggish without being particularly inventive." He highlighted the track "Wreck" by Kool Keith and Ol' Dirty Bastard, but also claimed that it "doesn't really live up to expectations." Describing the material as "blunt hip-hop that isn't as brutal as it appears," Erlewine concluded that the album "will only be of interest to wrestling fans, not to hip-hop fanatics."

Track listing

Personnel

Binky – production (tracks 4–6, 8, 9, 11 and 12)
Greg Danylyshyn – production (tracks 1, 2 and 7)
Rashad Coes – co-production (tracks 1, 7)
Jam Master Jay – production (track 1)
Kool Keith – production (track 2)
Rockwilder – production (track 3)
R.A. the Rugged Man – co-production (track 8)
Mark "Boogie" Brown – production (track 10)
Dame Grease – production (track 13)

Charts

Weekly charts

Year-end charts

Certifications

See also

Music in professional wrestling

References

Aggression
WWF Aggression
WWF Aggression
WWF Aggression
WWF Aggression